Mogyoróska is a village in Borsod-Abaúj-Zemplén County in northeastern Hungary. Near to Regéc in the Zemplén Mountains. Because of the picturesque landscape the village is on the path of the National Blue Trail.

References

Populated places in Borsod-Abaúj-Zemplén County